"Spin (Everybody's Doin' It)" is a song by Australian recording artist Vanessa Amorosi. The song was released in Australia on 28 October 2002 as an Australian only single. It was the sole Australian single release from Amorosi's second studio album Change and it peaked at 34 on the ARIA charts.

Track listing

Charts

Release history

References 

2002 singles
Vanessa Amorosi songs